Keep The Light Alive: Celebrating The Music of Lowen & Navarro is a tribute album celebrating the 20-year musical career of Lowen & Navarro and raising awareness and funds for research into amyotrophic lateral sclerosis (ALS). The proceeds benefit the Eric Lowen Trust, ALS Association Greater Los Angeles and Augie's Quest.

On March 17, 2004, David Eric Lowen was diagnosed with ALS, also known as Lou Gehrig's disease. Because of compromises to Eric's playing and singing, Lowen & Navarro held their final show on June 6, 2009, in Alexandria, Virginia, at The Birchmere. Lowen died from ALS on March 23, 2012. Dan Navarro continues to tour as a solo performer.

Track listing
"Weight Of The World" – Jackson Browne
"Keep The Light Alive" – John Ondrasik of Five For Fighting
"If You Loved Me Like That" – Keb' Mo'
"We Belong" – The Bangles
"Open Your Heart" – Severin Browne
"Old Riverside" – Joel Rafael
"You Stay On My Mind" – Andy Chase
"Compass Point" – The Refugees
"I Don't Believe In Yesterday" – Freebo
"Just To See You" – Eddie From Ohio
"Opposite Of Everything" – Phil Parlapiano
"Cold Outside" – Charlie Wadhams
"If I Was The Rain" – Stonehoney

External links 
 Official website

2009 albums
Tribute albums